Ust-Kulom (Kulömdïn) is a rural locality (a selo) and the administrative center of Ust-Kulomsky District of the Komi Republic, Russia. Population:

References

Notes

Sources

Rural localities in the Komi Republic